Ards was a constituency of the Parliament of Northern Ireland.

Boundaries
Ards was a county constituency comprising the town of Newtownards, the Ards peninsula and the town of Donaghadee.  It was created in 1929 when the House of Commons (Method of Voting and Redistribution of Seats) Act (Northern Ireland) 1929 introduced first past the post elections throughout Northern Ireland.  Ards was created by the division of Down into eight new constituencies.  The constituency survived unchanged, returning one member of Parliament until the Parliament of Northern Ireland was temporarily suspended in 1972, and then formally abolished in 1973.

Politics
Ards had a unionist majority, and consistently elected Ulster Unionist Party members.  It was sometimes contested by members of the Ulster Liberal Party, Northern Ireland Labour Party or Commonwealth Labour Party, who received between 19% and 42% of the votes cast.

Members of Parliament

May died during his time in office and his seat was vacant at dissolution.

Elections

At the 1933 and 1938 general elections, Henry Mulholland was elected unopposed.

At the 1949 Northern Ireland general election, William May was elected unopposed.

At the 1958 Northern Ireland general election, William May was elected unopposed.

At the 1969 Northern Ireland general election, William Long was elected unopposed.

 Parliament prorogued 30 March 1972 and abolished 18 July 1973

References

Constituencies of the Northern Ireland Parliament
Newtownards
Northern Ireland Parliament constituencies established in 1929
Historic constituencies in County Down
Northern Ireland Parliament constituencies disestablished in 1973